The 1997 UC Davis football team represented the University of California, Davis as an independent during the 1997 NCAA Division II football season. Led by fifth-year head coach Bob Biggs, UC Davis compiled an overall record of 9–5. 1997 was the 28th consecutive winning season for the Aggies. UC Davis was ranked No. 14 in the NCAA Division II poll at the end of the regular season and advanced to the NCAA Division II Football Championship playoffs. They upset fourth-ranked  in Kingsville, Texas in the first round for the second straight season. In the quarterfinals, the Aggies upset sixth-ranked  in San Angelo, Texas before falling in the semifinals to second-ranked  in West Haven, Connecticut. The team outscored its opponents 378 to 325 for the season. The Aggies played home games at Toomey Field in Davis, California.

Schedule

References

UC Davis
UC Davis Aggies football seasons
UC Davis Aggies football